Magdalen College, Oxford, like all Oxford colleges, may elect certain 
distinguished old members of the college, or benefactors and friends, as 'Honorary Fellows' as an honour and sign of respect or appreciation.  This is a list of those so elected:

 Anatole Abragam
 Montek Singh Ahluwalia
 Julian Barnes
 Stephen Breyer
 Peter Brook
 Nicolas Browne-Wilkinson, Baron Browne-Wilkinson
 Harry Christophers
 Sir David Clary
 Cecil Clementi
 Sir John Eccles
 Bill Emmott
 Gareth Evans
 James Fenton
 Howard Florey, Baron Florey
 Malcolm Fraser
 Christopher Geidt, Baron Geidt
 A. D. Godley
 Keith Griffin
 William Hague, Baron Hague of Richmond
 Seamus Heaney
 John Hemming
 Alan Hollinghurst
 Michael Jay, Baron Jay of Ewelme
 Dame Frances Kirwan
 Donald Knuth
 Harold Hongju Koh
 Sir Anthony Leggett
 C.S. Lewis
 Sir Kit McMahon
 Sir Peter Medawar
 J. H. C. Morris
 Kumi Naidoo
 Patrick Neill, Baron Neill of Bladen
 Sir Walter Parratt
 Sir Jonathan Porritt
 Sir Shridath Ramphal
 Matt Ridley, Viscount Ridley
 Anthony Smith
 David Souter
 Michael Spence
 Strobe Talbott
 A.J.P. Taylor
 Sir Michael Wheeler-Booth
 Simon Woolley, Baron Woolley of Woodford
 John Zachary Young

 
Magdalen